Austin Savage (born May 17, 1991) is an American retired soccer player who played the majority of his career as a forward for the Charleston Battery in the USL.

Career
Savage grew up in the Charleston area, attending Stratford High School and playing club soccer for Bridge Futbol Alliance, the precursor to the current Charleston Battery academy. Savage played college soccer at the Clemson University between 2009 and 2012. During his time at Clemson, Savage also played with Palmetto FC Bantams in the USL Premier Development League in 2012.

Savage signed with USL Professional Division club Charleston Battery on April 3, 2013, becoming the first player from the Battery's youth system to sign a professional contract with the first team. Savage was released by the Battery following his rookie season, and spent the majority of 2014 playing with SC United Bantams of the Premier Development League.

Savage resigned with the Battery ahead of the 2015 season, but was mainly used as a bench player. Savage scored his first and only goal for the Battery on May 9, 2016 against the Harrisburg City Islanders before announcing his retirement on June 27 of that year.

Savage signed with Major Arena Soccer League club Utica City FC on December 7, 2018, as a depth player. He did not appear in a league game.

References

External links
 Clemson Tigers bio

1991 births
Living people
American soccer players
Soccer players from South Carolina
Clemson Tigers men's soccer players
SC United Bantams players
Charleston Battery players
USL League Two players
USL Championship players
Association football forwards
Utica City FC players
United Premier Soccer League players